Nondito Noroke ( "In Blissful Hell") is a 1972 novel by Bangladeshi author Humayun Ahmed. Ahmed wrote this debut novel in 1970 while he was an undergraduate student at the University of Dhaka. Ahmed Sharif wrote the introduction of the book.

A theatrical play was adopted with the original book title in 1975 by 'Bahubachan'.

The book was made into the 2006 film with the original book title, starring Ferdous Ahmed, Litu Anam, Khairul Alam Sabuj, Monir Khan Shimul, Sumona Shoma. The film was directed by Belal Ahmed.

Characters
 Rabeya
 Khoka
 Montu
 Runu
 Khoka, Rabeya and Montu's father
 Khoka, Rabeya and Montu's mother
 Master Chacha
 Haroon
 Advocate

Film cast
 Ferdous Ahmed as Khoka
 Litu Anam as Montu
 Khairul Alam Sabuj as Khoka, Rabeya and Montu's Father
 Monir Khan Shimul as Haroon
 Sumona Shoma as Rabeya
 Jyotika Jyoti as Runu
 Afroza Banu as Khoka, Rabeya and Montu's Mother
 Keramat Moula as Master Chacha
 Amir Shirazi as Advocate

References

Further reading

External links

1972 novels
Bengali-language novels
Bangladeshi novels
Novels by Humayun Ahmed
1972 debut novels
Bengali-language Bangladeshi films
2006 films
Films based on Bangladeshi novels
Novels set in Bangladesh
Films set in Bangladesh
2000s Bengali-language films
Bengali-language plays
Bangladeshi drama
Theatre in Bangladesh
 1975 plays
Bangladeshi plays